Ahmet Duman is a Turkish freestyle wrestler competing in the 57 kg division. He is a member of Ankara ASKI.

Career 
In 2019, he won the silver medal in the men's 57 kg event at the 2019 European Juniors Wrestling Championships held in Pontevedra, Spain.

References

External links 
 

1999 births
Living people
Turkish male sport wrestlers
21st-century Turkish people